El Campo High School is a public high school located in El Campo, Texas, United States, and classified as a 4A school by the UIL.  It is part of the El Campo Independent School District located in Wharton County.

Athletics

Teams
El Campo competes in these sports - 

Baseball
Boys & girls basketball
Cross Country
Football
Golf
Boys & girls soccer
Softball
Swimming
Tennis
Boys & girls track 
Volleyball

State Championships
Baseball
1962 AAAA State Champions
1968 AAAA State Champions
1982 AAAA State Champions

Demographics
55% of the student population at El Campo High School identify as Hispanic, 32% identify as Caucasian, 11% identify as African American, 1% identify as multiracial, and 1% identify as American Indian/Alaskan Native. The student body makeup is 51% male and 49% female.

Notable alumni
Cole Hunt - XFL tight end for the St. Louis BattleHawks
Joey Hunt - NFL center for the Seattle Seahawks

References

External links
El Campo HS

Schools in Wharton County, Texas
Public high schools in Texas